Robin Hood (born September 26, 1964) is an American professional golfer who played on the LPGA Tour.

Hood was born in Mishawaka, Indiana. She played college golf at Oklahoma State University where she was a three-time All-American (1984, 1986, 1987).

Hood won once on the LPGA Tour in 1989.

Amateur wins (9)
1981 Indiana Women's State Amateur
1982 Indiana Women's State Amateur
1983 Suncoast Invitational, Indiana Women's State Amateur
1984 Big Eight Conference Championship
1985 Susie Maxwell Berning Classic
1986 Big Eight Conference Championship
1987 Betsy Rawls Invitational, Mustang Invitational

Professional wins

LPGA Tour wins (1)

References

American female golfers
Oklahoma State Cowgirls golfers
LPGA Tour golfers
Golfers from Indiana
People from Mishawaka, Indiana
1964 births
Living people